Quest: An African Journal of Philosophy is an academic journal publishing philosophical discussions on problems that arise out of the radical transformations Africa and Africans are undergoing. Quest includes materials on both current subjects related to Africa, and subjects of general philosophical interest, serving an international public of professional philosophers and intellectuals in other disciplines with philosophical interest. Quest publishes original articles written in either English or French, each with a summary in the other language.

External links 
 

Philosophy journals
African studies journals
Multilingual journals
Publications established in 1987
Biannual journals